Predrag Šarić "Šiši" (born November 20, 1959) is a Croatian former professional basketball player. In his career, he played for Šibenka, Zadar, and Triglav Osiguranje Rijeka. He also played for the Yugoslavia national team six times.

Playing career
Šarić, in his pro career, played for Šibenka in the 1980s with Dražen Petrović, becoming Yugoslav First League runner-up in 1983. He also played two times in the Korać Cup final games against Limoges, which beat them both times. Later, Šarić played for Zadar and Triglav Osiguranje Rijeka, where he had played with famous Yugoslav players, Danko Cvjetičanin from Croatia, and Mario Primorac from Bosnia and Herzegovina.

Personal life
Šarić was born in Šibenik. Predrag married former professional basketball player Veselinka Crvak, who played with the Yugoslav champions, Elemes Šibenik. Their children, a son Dario and daughter Dana, are the professional basketball players. Dario plays for the Phoenix Suns of the National Basketball Association (NBA), and Dana plays for Croatian ŽKK Šibenik.

References  

1959 births
Living people
Croatian men's basketball players
KK Šibenik players
KK Zadar players
Yugoslav men's basketball players
Basketball players from Šibenik
Small forwards
KK Kvarner players